The Front Deutscher Äpfel (short F.D.Ä.; German for Front of German Apples), also called Apfelfront (Apple Front) is a satirical organisation, founded in Leipzig in 2004. It satirizes right extremist parties, especially the Nationaldemokratische Partei Deutschlands (NPD). In the style of former and existing right extremist organisational structures it is subdivided into numerous sub-groups like the youth organisation Nationales Frischobst Deutschland (NFD; National Fresh Fruit of Germany), the women's organisation Bund weicher Birnen (B.W.B.; League of Soft Pears, compare League of German Girls; Birne, pear, is a German colloquial term for head, "eine weiche Birne haben" ("to have a soft pear"), is synonymous to "being very stupid") and many further local Gaue.

Platform 

The Apple Front argues in favour of political requirements for purification of the German fruit crop. The organisation describes itself as "Nationale Initiative gegen die Überfremdung des deutschen Obstbestandes und gegen faul herumlungerndes Fallobst" - translated "National initiative against the overforeignization of German fruit crop and against lazy/rotten mooching fallen fruit" (faul means both lazy and rotten).

The key demands of the organisation are:
 Termination of the overforeignisation of German fruit by engrafting of foreign species.
 Closing the borders against tropical fruits ("Grenzen dicht für Fremdobst!" - English "Close the borders against foreign fruit!").
 Elimination of lazy/rotten (compare faul above) windfall ("Macht Fallobst zu Mus!" - English "Make windfall to mush!").

The Apfelfront tries to use overly Germanized terminology in press releases and statements, at public demonstrations and on their website just like original right and extreme right internet services, and mimics the public appearance of the NSDAP and modern right extremist organisations. Therefore "homepage" is called "Heimseite", "webpage" is named "Weltnetzseite" and "bulletin board/forum" is turned into "Brett" (all three English terms are common in current German usage; the translated/transformed German terms are commonly perceived as xenophobic or at least ridiculous in context of information technology).

Particular terms, slogans and rhetorical devices used by the NPD and especially by Holger Apfel, their chairperson in the Landtag of Saxony, such as "Grenzen dicht!" ("Close the borders!") are picked up by the Apple Front and get used overly explicitly but are changed in their political message to orcharding and fruit utilization in order to make the original political statements and their representatives appear ridiculous.

 History and activities 
The Front Deutscher Äpfel was founded shortly after the Saxon election of 19 September 2004. The group, and Alf Thum, its founder, considers itself not as leftist but as non-right. They consider themselves to be artists who are trying to break away from the demonstration-counterdemonstration ritual.

The Front's youth organisation (most German political parties have active youth organisations) is called Nationales Frischobst Deutschlands (National Fresh Fruit of Germany). The Bund weicher Birnen (League of Soft Pears/Heads''') is affiliated with them in their national struggle.

Since its founding, the Apfelfront has attended all larger NPD and neo-nazi marches/parades, especially in Eastern Germany. They have also got involved with Berlin 05, a youth politics festival sponsored by the German federal government.

The Apfelfront has also been represented in the state of Mecklenburg-Vorpommern since August 2006.

Commentary
Disruptions occasionally arise after an appearance by the Apfelfront, especially as the flags and symbols are not always immediately recognised as a parody. Mitteldeutscher Rundfunk published an article about the NPD on 25 July 2006, in which it portrayed a photo of the Apfelfront, with a subtitle, "The NPD wants to distance itself from its image of violence". The mistake was soon noticed, and the picture was removed.

See also
 Culture jamming
 Discordianism
 Guerrilla marketing
 Spaßguerilla

Sources
 Anke Wolf: Widerstand gegen Rechts einmal anders www.projekt-p.de 2005
 Sven Näbrich: Verbunden mit der deutschen Rundfrucht'' Sächsische Zeitung, 12 June 2005 – cited in: Aktion Zivilcourage Pirna: Die Rundfrucht-Patrioten www.nadeshda.org

External links

 www.apfelfront.de Front Deutscher Äpfel website
 Armed with satire, German group challenges neo-Nazis (2010)
 Meet Germany's response to neo-Nazis: The German Apples Front (2014)

Anti-fascism in Germany
Joke political parties in Germany